Serruria balanocephala, the acorn spiderhead, is a flower-bearing shrub that belongs to the genus Serruria and forms part of the fynbos. The plant is native to the Western Cape and occurs on the Langeberg between Montagu and Swellendam. The shrub grows upright and grows 1.0 m long and flowers from late August to December.

The plant grows on the northern slopes at altitudes of 600-650 m. The buds on which the pollen hangs are acorn-shaped, this is where the plant gets its name from.

References

External links 
 Threatened Species Programme | SANBI Red List of South African Plants
 Serruria balanocephala (Acorn spiderhead)
 Three new species of Serruria (Proteaceae) from the southwestern Cape

balanocephala